Fish stew is a generic name for a stew with a base or food ingredients of fish or seafood. It is also rarely used to refer to stew ponds.

List of fish stews

Types of fish stew from around the world include:
 Asam Pedas (Indonesian) and (Malaysian)
 Bouillabaisse (Provençal fish stew originating from Marseille, France)
 Bourride (another fish stew from Provence)
 Brudet (Italian, from Adriatic sea)
 Buridda (Italian, from Liguria)
 Cacciucco (Italian, from Livorno)
 Caldeirada (Portuguese)
 Caldo de mariscos (Mexican) stew, also known as caldo de siete mares
 Chepa pulus (tamarind-based South Indian fish stew from Andhra Pradesh)
 Cioppino (San Francisco version of an Italian fish stew)
 Cotriade (from Brittany)
 Fish head curry
 Ghalieh mahi (Persian)
 Haemul jeongol (Korean)
 Halászlé (Hungarian paprika-based river fish soup)
 Kokotxas (a traditional Basque fish stew)
 Maeuntang (spicy Korean soup)
 Moqueca (traditional Brazilian stew)
 Riblji paprikaš (spicy Croatian fish stew from Slavonia)
 Saengseon jjigae (Korean, similar to jeongol)
  Shui zhu yu (Sichuan Chinese)
 Suquet de peix (Valencian stew, similar to bouillabaisse)
 Tuna pot
 Ukha, Russian fish soup

See also

 Fish soup
 List of fish and seafood soups
 List of soups
 List of stews
 Chowder

References

Fish dishes
Stews
Soup-related lists